"I'm with You" is a song by Australian singer-songwriter Vance Joy. A 15-second sample of the song was released on Joy's Facebook page in February 2018, a week before the release of Joy's second studio album Nation of Two. A single edit and re-recorded version was released on 21 September 2018 as the sixth single from Joy's Nation of Two. Upon released, Joy said: "Last month, at the end of the North American, tour I went back into the studio to re-record a song from Nation of Two. It's one of my favourite songs off the album, and a lot of people I have met over the last few months on tour have shared how much they love this track as well. I wanted to create a version with a band feel that had a bit more fire."

Video
The video was directed by Mimi Cave and released on 22 October 2018. Broadway World reviewed the video, saying that "the stunning video is a perfect companion piece to the song. Shot in Hawaii, it follows two women through a magical landscape, with a dreamlike feel."

Track listing

Charts

Certifications

References
 

2018 singles
2017 songs
Vance Joy songs
Songs written by Vance Joy